Sutton Staithe Halt was a railway station on the Midland and Great Northern Joint Railway which was opened in 1933 to serve the holidaymakers visiting the Norfolk Broads in the vicinity of the village of Sutton.

History

The station was opened by the Midland and Great Northern Joint Railway in 1933 to serve the increasing numbers of holidaymakers who were visiting the Norfolk Broads and coastal beaches within reach of the village of Sutton. This attempt to increase revenue on the line was, however, short-lived possibly due to its location on the northern extremity of the Broads. The single station platform was very basic in design, consisting of no more than a few sleepers at ground level, with passengers alighting with the aid of a set of retractable steps leading down from the Sentinel Railcar which called at the tourist halts on the line.

References

 
 
 
 

Disused railway stations in Norfolk
Former Midland and Great Northern Joint Railway stations
Railway stations in Great Britain opened in 1933
Railway stations in Great Britain closed in 1935